Richard Charles Turner OBE (24 April 1952 - 27 June 2018) was county archaeologist for Cheshire and later worked for the Inspectorate of Ancient Monuments and Historical Buildings in Wales. At Cheshire he was responsible for saving the remains of Lindow Man.

References 

1952 births
2018 deaths
People from Barrow-in-Furness
English archaeologists
Members of the Order of the British Empire
Deaths from cancer in England
Alumni of Christ's College, Cambridge